2090 Aluminium alloy consists of copper, lithium, zirconium as minor elements and other impurity alloying elements.

Chemical composition

Physical properties

Mechanical properties

Thermal properties

Applications 
Aluminium 2090 alloy is used in aircraft components.
 Aircraft floor bulkhead stiffeners
 Wing leading and trailing edges
 Fuselage bulkhead webs

Aluminium alloy table

References 

Aluminium–copper alloys